Niall "Slippers" Madden (born 11 November 1985) is a retired Irish jockey who rode the racehorse Numbersixvalverde to win the 2006 Grand National steeplechase at Aintree Racecourse. 

Madden's nickname is "Slippers", as a comparison with his father Niall Madden, also a jockey, whose nickname was "Boots". He rode for Noel Meade and won the 2006 Christmas Hurdle for Meade on Jazz Messenger. Madden retired as a jockey after riding at Punchestown on 31 December 2020.

Major wins
 Ireland
 Slaney Novice Hurdle  -(1) Toofarback  (2006)
 Golden Cygnet Novice Hurdle  -(1) Liskennett  (2008)
 Paddy's Reward Club "Sugar Paddy" Chase  -(1) Nickname (2006)

 Great Britain
Grand National    -(1) Numbersixvalverde (2006)
 Christmas Hurdle - (1) Jazz Messenger (2006)

References

BBC article about Madden's 2007 Grand National ride

1985 births
Irish jockeys
Living people